The rapture is an eschatological position held by some Christians, particularly those of American evangelicalism, consisting of an end-time event when all Christian believers who are alive, along with resurrected believers, will rise "in the clouds, to meet the Lord in the air." The origin of the term extends from Paul the Apostle's First Epistle to the Thessalonians in the Bible, in which he uses the Greek word , meaning "to snatch away" or "to seize," and explains that believers in Jesus Christ would be snatched away from earth into the air. 

The idea of a rapture as it is currently defined is not found in historic Christianity, and is a relatively recent doctrine. The term is used frequently among fundamentalist theologians in the United States. Rapture has also been used for a mystical union with God or for eternal life in Heaven.

This view of eschatology is referred to as premillennial dispensationalism, which is a form of futurism.

Differing viewpoints exist about the exact timing of the rapture and whether Christ's return would occur in one event or two. Pretribulationism distinguishes the rapture from the second coming of Jesus Christ mentioned in the Gospel of Matthew, 2 Thessalonians, and Revelation. This view holds that the rapture would precede the seven-year Tribulation, which would culminate in Christ's second coming and be followed by a thousand-year Messianic Kingdom. This theory grew out of the translations of the Bible that John Nelson Darby analyzed in 1833. Pretribulationism is the most widely held view among Christians believing in the rapture today, although this view is disputed within evangelicalism. Some assert a post-tribulational rapture.

Most Christian denominations do not subscribe to rapture theology and have a different interpretation of the aerial gathering described in 1 Thessalonians 4. Catholics, Eastern Orthodox, Lutherans, Anglicans, Episcopalians, Presbyterians, the United Church of Christ, most Methodist and Reformed Christians, Unity Church, Latter-day Saints, etc. do not generally use rapture as a specific theological term, nor do they generally subscribe to the premillennial dispensational views associated with its use. Instead these groups typically interpret rapture in the sense of the elect gathering with Christ in Heaven after his second coming and reject the idea that a large segment of humanity will be left behind on earth for an extended tribulation period after the events of 1 Thessalonians 4:17.

Etymology
Rapture is derived from Middle French , via the Medieval Latin  ("seizure, kidnapping"), which derives from the Latin  ("a carrying off").

Greek
The Koine Greek of 1 Thessalonians 4:17 uses the verb form , which means "we shall be caught up" or "we shall be taken away". This use is also seen in such texts as Acts 8:39, 2 Corinthians 12:2–4, and Revelation 12:5. Linguist, Dr. Douglas Hamp, notes that Greek scholar Spiros Zodhiates lists  as the first-person plural future passive indicative of the Greek stem, harpagē (har-pag-ay), “the act of plundering, plunder, spoil.” The future passive indicative of harpázō (although not used by Paul in 1 Thess. 4:17) can be viewed at verbix.com: αρπασθησόμεθα (harpasthesometha). GS724 harpagē means: 1. the act of plundering, robbery; 2. plunder, spoil. When the rapture and the "restoration of all things" (Acts 3:20-21) are viewed as simultaneous events (according to Romans 8:19-21) then it makes sense why Paul would use "shall be plundered" to match the verbiage of the distortion of the Earth described in Isaiah 24:3, "The land shall be entirely emptied and utterly plundered...".

Latin
The Latin Vulgate translates the Greek  as  meaning "we are caught up" or "we are taken away" from the Latin verb  meaning "to catch up" or "take away".

English Bible translations
English versions of the Bible have expressed the concept of the Latin term  in various ways:
 The Wycliffe Bible (1395), translated from the Latin Vulgate, uses "rushed".
 The Tyndale New Testament (1525), the Bishop's Bible (1568), the Geneva Bible (1587) and the King James Version (1611) use "caught up". This is carried over to the American Standard Version (1901) and the Revised Standard Version (1946, 1952).
 The online NET Bible (1995–2005) translates the Greek of 1 Thessalonians 4:17 using the phrase "suddenly caught up" with the footnote: "Or 'snatched up.' The Greek verb  implies that the action is quick or forceful, so the translation supplied the adverb 'suddenly' to make this implicit notion clear."

Doctrinal position

The Catholic Church, Eastern Orthodox Church, the Lutheran Churches, the Anglican Communion, and Reformed denominations have no tradition of a preliminary return of Christ. The Eastern Orthodox Church, for example, favors amillennial or postmillennial interpretation of prophetic Scriptures and thus rejects a preliminary, premillennial return. Most Methodists do not adhere to the dispensationalist view of the rapture.

Fundamentalist Baptists, Bible churches, Brethren churches, certain Methodist denominations, Pentecostals, non-denominational evangelicals, and various other evangelical groups typically adhere to the pretribulational Rapture.

Views

Tenets
 Those who are alive and remain unto the coming of the Lord shall not precede those who are dead (1 Thessalonians 4:15)
 The dead in Christ will resurrect first (1 Thessalonians 4:16).
 The living and the resurrected dead will be caught up together in the clouds to meet the Lord in the air (1 Thessalonians 4:17).
 The meeting with the Lord will be permanent: "And so shall we ever be with the Lord" (1 Thessalonians 4:17, KJV).

One or two events

Most premillennialists distinguish the Rapture and the Second Coming as separate events. Some dispensational premillennialists (including many evangelicals) hold the return of Christ to be two distinct events (i.e., Christ's second coming in two stages). According to this view, 1 Thessalonians 4:15–17 is a description of a preliminary event to the return described in Matthew 24:29–31. Although both describe a coming of Jesus, these are seen to be different events. The first event is a coming where the saved are to be 'caught up,' whence the term "rapture" is taken. The second event is described as the second coming. The majority of dispensationalists hold that the first event precedes the period of tribulation, even if not immediately (see chart for additional dispensationalist timing views). Dispensationalists distinguish these events as a result of own literal understanding of Paul's words.

Amillennialists deny the interpretation of a literal thousand-year earthly rule of Christ. There is considerable overlap in the beliefs of amillennialists (including most Catholics, Eastern Orthodox, Anglicans, and Lutherans), postmillennialists (including Presbyterians), and historic premillennialists (including some Calvinistic Baptists) with those who hold that the return of Christ will be a single, public event.

Some proponents believe the doctrine of amillennialism originated with Alexandrian scholars such as Clement and Origen and later became Catholic dogma through Augustine.

Destination
Dispensationalists see the immediate destination of the raptured Christians as being Heaven. Catholic commentators, such as Walter Drum (1912), identify the destination of the 1 Thessalonians 4:17 gathering as Heaven.

While Anglicans have many views, some Anglican commentators, such as N. T. Wright, identify the destination as a specific place on Earth. This interpretation may sometimes be connected to Christian environmentalist concerns.

Views of eschatological timing
There are numerous views regarding the timing of the Rapture. Some maintain that Matthew 24:37–40 refers to the Rapture, pointing out similarities between the two texts, indicating that the Rapture would occur at the parousia of the Lord. Others point out that neither church nor rapture occur in Matthew 24 and there are significant differences between Matthew 24:37–40 and 1 Thessalonians 4:13–18. As a result, these two texts receive the overwhelming focus within discussions about the Rapture's timing. The two texts are as follows:

In the amillennial and postmillennial views there are no distinctions in the timing of the Rapture. These views regard that the Rapture, as it is described in 1 Thessalonians 4:15–17, would be identical to the Second Coming of Jesus as described in Matthew 24:29–31 after the spiritual/symbolic millennium.

In the premillennial view, the Rapture would be before a literal, earthly millennium. Within premillennialism, the pretribulation position distinguishes between the Rapture and the Second Coming as two different events. There are also other positions within premillennialism that differ with regard to the timing of the Rapture.

Premillennialist views

In the earliest days of the church, chiliastic teaching (i.e., early premillennialism) was the dominant view. Eusebius wrote, "To these [written accounts] belong his [Papias of Hierapolis] statement that there will be a period of some thousand years after the resurrection of the dead, and that the kingdom of Christ will be set up in the material form on this very earth. [...] But it was due to him that so many of the Church Fathers after him adopted a like opinion, urging in their own support the antiquity of the man; as for instance Irenaeus and anyone else that may have proclaimed similar views."

Schaff further confirms this by stating, "The most striking point in the eschatology of the ante-Nicene age is the prominent chiliasm, or millennarianism, that is the belief of a visible reign of Christ in glory on earth with the risen saints for a thousand years, before the general resurrection and judgment."

Over time, however, a clash surfaced between two schools of interpretation, the Antiochene and Alexandrian schools. The Alexandrian school's roots can be traced back to the influence of Philo, a Hellenized Jew who sought to reconcile God's veracity with what he thought were errors in the Tanakh. Alexandrian theologians viewed the Millennium as a symbolic reign of Christ from Heaven. Through the influence of Origen and Augustine—students of the Alexandrian school—allegorical interpretation rose to prominence, and its eschatology became the majority view for more than a thousand years. As a reaction to the rise of allegorical interpretation the Antiochene school insisted on a literal hermeneutic. but did little to counter the Alexandrian's symbolic Millennium.

In the twelfth century futurism became prominent again when Joachim of Fiore (1130–1202) wrote a commentary on Revelation and insisted that the end was near and taught that God would restore the earth, the Jews would be converted, and the Millennium would take place on earth. His teaching influenced much of Europe.

Though the Catholic Church does not generally regard Biblical prophecy in texts such as Daniel and Revelation as strictly future-based (when viewed from the standpoint of our present time), in 1590 Francisco Ribera, a Catholic Jesuit, taught futurism. He also taught that a gathering-of-the-elect event (similar to what is now called the rapture) would happen 45 days before the end of a 3.5-year tribulation.

The concept of the rapture, in connection with premillennialism, was expressed by the 17th-century American Puritans Increase and Cotton Mather. They held to the idea that believers would be caught up in the air, followed by judgments on earth, and then the millennium.
Other 17th-century expressions of the rapture are found in the works of: Robert Maton, Nathaniel Holmes, John Browne, Thomas Vincent, Henry Danvers, and William Sherwin.

The term rapture was used by Philip Doddridge and John Gill in their New Testament commentaries, with the idea that believers would be caught up prior to judgment on earth and Jesus' second coming.

An 1828 edition of Matthew Henry's An Exposition of the Old and New Testament uses the word "rapture" in explicating 1 Thessalonians 4:17.

Although not using the term "rapture", the idea was more fully developed by Edward Irving (1792–1834). In 1825, Irving directed his attention to the study of prophecy and eventually accepted the one-man Antichrist idea of James Henthorn Todd, Samuel Roffey Maitland, Robert Bellarmine, and Francisco Ribera, yet he went a step further. Irving began to teach the idea of a two-phase return of Christ, the first phase being a secret rapture prior to the rise of the Antichrist. Edward Miller described Irving's teaching like this: "There are three gatherings: – First, of the first-fruits of the harvest, the wise virgins who follow the Lamb whithersoever He goeth; next, the abundant harvest gathered afterwards by God; and lastly, the assembling of the wicked for punishment."

Pre-tribulational premillennialism
Pre-tribulationalism was popularized in the 1830s by John Nelson Darby and the Plymouth Brethren and was further promoted in the United States through the wide circulation of the Scofield Reference Bible in the early 20th century.

The pre-tribulation position advocates that the rapture will occur before the beginning of a seven-year tribulation period, while the second coming will occur at the end of it. Pre-tribulationists often describe the rapture as Jesus coming for the church and the second coming as Jesus coming with the church. Pre-tribulation educators and preachers include Jimmy Swaggart, Robert Jeffress, J. Dwight Pentecost, Tim LaHaye, J. Vernon McGee, Perry Stone, Chuck Smith, Hal Lindsey, Jack Van Impe, Chuck Missler, Grant Jeffrey, Thomas Ice, David Jeremiah, John F. MacArthur, and John Hagee. While many pre-tribulationists are also dispensationalists, not all pre-tribulationists are dispensationalists.

John Nelson Darby first proposed and popularized the pre-tribulation rapture in 1827. This view was accepted among many other Plymouth Brethren movements in England. Darby and other prominent Brethren were part of the Brethren movement which impacted American Christianity, especially with movements and teachings associated with Christian eschatology and fundamentalism, primarily through their writings. Influences included the Bible Conference Movement, starting in 1878 with the Niagara Bible Conference. These conferences, which were initially inclusive of historicist and futurist premillennialism, led to an increasing acceptance of futurist premillennial views and the pre-tribulation rapture especially among Presbyterian, Baptist, and Congregational members. Popular books also contributed to acceptance of the pre-tribulation rapture, including William E. Blackstone's book Jesus is Coming, published in 1878, which sold more than 1.3 million copies, and the Scofield Reference Bible, published in 1909 and 1919 and revised in 1967.

Some pre-tribulation proponents, such as Grant Jeffrey, maintain that the earliest known extra-Biblical reference to the pre-tribulation rapture is from a 7th-century tract known as the Apocalypse of Pseudo-Ephraem the Syrian. Different authors have proposed several different versions of the text as authentic and there are differing opinions as to whether it supports belief in a pre-tribulation rapture. One version of the text reads, "For all the saints and Elect of God are gathered, prior to the tribulation that is to come, and are taken to the Lord lest they see the confusion that is to overwhelm the world because of our sins." In addition, The Apocalypse of Elijah and The History of Brother Dolcino both state that believers will be removed prior to the Tribulation.

There exists at least one 18th-century and two 19th-century pre-tribulation references: in an essay published in 1788 in Philadelphia by the Baptist Morgan Edwards which articulated the concept of a pre-tribulation rapture, in the writings of Catholic priest Manuel Lacunza in 1812, and by John Nelson Darby in 1827. Manuel Lacunza (1731–1801), a Jesuit priest (under the pseudonym Juan Josafat Ben Ezra), wrote an apocalyptic work entitled La venida del Mesías en gloria y majestad (The Coming of the Messiah in Glory and Majesty). The book appeared first in 1811, 10 years after his death. In 1827, it was translated into English by the Scottish minister Edward Irving.

During the 1970s, belief in the rapture became popular in wider circles, in part because of the books of Hal Lindsey, including The Late Great Planet Earth, which has reportedly sold between 15 million and 35 million copies, and the movie A Thief in the Night, which based its title on the scriptural reference 1 Thessalonians 5:2. Lindsey proclaimed that the rapture was imminent, based on world conditions at the time.

In 1995, the doctrine of the pre-tribulation rapture was further popularized by Tim LaHaye's Left Behind series of books, which sold close to 80 million copies and was made into several movies and four real-time strategy video games.

Mid-tribulational premillennialism
The mid-tribulation position espouses that the rapture will occur at some point in the middle of what is popularly called the tribulation period, or during Daniel's 70th Week. The tribulation is typically divided into two periods of 3.5 years each. Mid-tribulationists hold that the saints will go through the first period (Beginning of Travail), but will be raptured into Heaven before the severe outpouring of God's wrath in the second half of what is popularly called the Great Tribulation. At the halfway point of the tribulation, the Antichrist will commit the "abomination of desolation" by desecrating the Jerusalem temple. Mid-tribulationist teachers include Harold Ockenga, James O. Buswell (a reformed, Calvinistic Presbyterian), and Norman Harrison. This position is a minority view among premillennialists.

Prewrath premillennialism
The prewrath rapture view also places the rapture at some point during the tribulation period before the second coming. This view holds that the tribulation of the church begins toward the latter part of a seven-year period, being Daniel's 70th week, when the Antichrist is revealed in the temple. This latter half of a seven-year period [i.e.  years] is defined as the great tribulation, although the exact duration is not known. References from Matthew 24, Mark 13, and Luke 21 are used as evidence that this tribulation will be cut short by the coming of Christ to deliver the righteous by means of the rapture, which will occur after specific events in Revelation, in particular after the sixth seal is opened and the sun is darkened and the moon is turned to blood. However, by this point many Christians will have been slaughtered as martyrs by the Antichrist. After the rapture will come God's seventh-seal wrath of trumpets and bowls (a.k.a. "the Day of the Lord"). The Day of the Lord's wrath against the ungodly will follow for the remainder of seven years.

Partial pre-tribulation premillennialism
The partial, conditional or selective rapture theory holds that all obedient Christians will be raptured before the great tribulation depending on ones personal fellowship (or closeness) between she or he and God, which is not to be confused with the relationship between the same and God (which is believer, regardless of fellowship.)  Therefore, it is believed by some that the rapture of a believer is determined by the timing of his conversion before the great tribulation. Other proponents of this theory hold that only those who are faithful in their relationship with God (having true fellowship with him) will be raptured, and the rest resurrected during the great tribulation, between the 5th and 6th seals of Revelation, having lost their lives during. Still others hold the rest will either be raptured during the tribulation or at its end. As stated by Ira David (a proponent of this view): “The saints will be raptured in groups during the tribulation as they are prepared to go.” Some notable proponents of this theory are G. H. Lang, Robert Chapman, G. H. Pember, Robert Govett, D. M. Panton, Watchman Nee, Ira E. David, J. A. Seiss, Hudson Taylor, Anthony Norris Groves, John Wilkinson, G. Campbell Morgan, Otto Stockmayer and Rev. J. W. (Chip) White Jr.

Post-tribulational premillennialism

In the post-tribulation premillennial position, the rapture would be identical to the second coming of Jesus or as a meeting in the air with Jesus that immediately precedes his return to the Earth before a literal millennium. The post-tribulation position places the rapture at the end of the tribulation period. Post-tribulation writers define the tribulation period in a generic sense as the entire present age, or in a specific sense of a period of time preceding the second coming of Christ. The emphasis in this view is that the church will undergo the tribulation.  – "Immediately after the Tribulation of those days...they shall gather together his elect..." – is cited as a foundational scripture for this view. Post-tribulationists perceive the rapture as occurring simultaneously with the second coming of Christ. Upon Jesus' return, believers will meet him in the air and will then accompany him in his return to the Earth. Moreover, after chapters 6–19, and after 20:1–3 when Satan is bound,  says, "and they lived, and reigned with Christ a thousand years. But the rest of the dead lived not again until the thousand years were finished. This is the first resurrection. Blessed and holy is he that hath part in the first resurrection."

Authors and teachers who support the post-tribulational view include Pat Robertson, Walter R. Martin, John Piper, George E. Ladd, Robert H. Gundry, and Douglas Moo.

Postmillennialism

In the postmillennialist view the millennium is seen as an indefinitely long time thus precluding literal interpretation of a thousand-year period. According to Loraine Boettner "the world will be Christianized, and the return of Christ will occur at the close of a long period of righteousness and peace, commonly called the millennium." Postmillennialists commonly view the rapture of the Church as one and the same event as the second coming of Christ. According to them the great tribulation was already fulfilled in the Jewish-Roman War of 66–73 AD that involved the destruction of Jerusalem. Authors who have expressed support for this view include the Puritan author of Pilgrim's Progress, John Bunyan, Jonathan Edwards and Charles Finney.

Amillennialism

Amillennialists view the millennial rule of Christ as the current, but indefinite period that began with the foundation of the church and that will end with the Second Coming—a period where Christ already reigns with his saints through the Eucharist and his church.  They view the life of the church as Christ's kingdom already established (inaugurated on the day of the Pentecost described in the first chapter of Acts), but not to be made complete until his second coming.  This framework precludes a literal interpretation of the thousand-year period mentioned in chapter twenty of Revelation, viewing the number "thousand" as numerologically symbolic and pertaining to the current age of the church. Amillennialists generally do not use "rapture" as a theological term, but they do view a similar event coinciding with the second coming—primarily as a mystical gathering with Christ. To amillennialists the final days already began on the day of the Pentecost, but that the great tribulation will occur during the final phase or conclusion of the millennium, with Christ then returning as the alpha and omega at the end of time.  Unlike premillennialists who predict the millennium as a literal thousand-year reign by Christ after his return, amillennialists emphasize the continuity and permanency of his reign throughout all periods of the New Covenant, past, present and future.  They do not regard mentions of Jerusalem in the chapter twenty-one of Revelation as pertaining to the present geographical city, but to a future new Jerusalem or "new heaven and new earth", for which the church through the twelve apostles (representing of the twelve tribes of Israel) currently lays the foundation in the messianic kingdom already present.  Unlike certain premillennial dispensationalists, they do not view the rebuilding of the temple of Jerusalem as either necessary or legitimate, because the practice of animal sacrifices has now been fulfilled in the life of the church through Christ's ultimate sacrifice on the cross.  Authors who have expressed support for the amillenialist view include St. Augustine.  The amillennialist viewpoint is the position held by the Catholic, Eastern Orthodox, and Anglican churches, as well as mainline Protestant bodies, such as Lutherans, Methodists, Presbyterians and many Reformed congregations.

Date

Since the origin of the concept, some believers have made predictions regarding the date of the event. All have failed in their attempt to set a date.

Failed predictions
Some predictions of the date of the Second Coming of Jesus (which may or may not refer to the rapture) include the following:
 1843-44: William Miller predicted that Christ would return between 21 March 1843 and 21 March 1844, then revised his prediction, claiming to have miscalculated the Bible, to 22 October 1844. The realization that the predictions were incorrect resulted in the Great Disappointment. Miller's theology gave rise to the Advent movement. Followers of the Baháʼí Faith believe that Christ did return as Miller predicted in 1844, with the advent of the Báb, and numerous Miller-like prophetic predictions from many religions are given in William Sears' book, Thief in The Night.
 1914, 1918, and 1925: Various dates predicted for the Second Coming of Jesus by the Jehovah's Witnesses.

Some predictions of the date of the rapture include the following:
 1981: Chuck Smith predicted that Jesus would probably return by 1981.
 1988: Edgar C. Whisenant published a book called "88 Reasons Why the Rapture Will Be in 1988".
 1994 September 6:  Radio evangelist Harold Camping predicted 6 September 1994.
 2011 May 21: Harold Camping's revised prediction put 21 May 2011 as the date of the rapture. After this date passed without apparent incident, Camping made a radio broadcast stating that a non-visible "spiritual judgement" had indeed taken place, and that the physical rapture would occur on 21 October 2011. On that date, according to Camping, the "whole world will be destroyed."
 2017 September 23: Christian numerologist David Meade motivated this date with astrological theories.

See also

 Bible prophecy
 Covenantalism
 Eschatology of Jehovah's Witnesses
 Kamikakushi
 Number of the beast
 Preterism
 Unfulfilled Christian religious predictions

Notes

References

External links
 

 
1833 introductions
Christian eschatology
New Testament words and phrases
Christian terminology
Entering heaven alive